Mohun Bagan Athletic Club is an Indian professional field hockey club located in Kolkata, West Bengal. It participates in various tournaments conducted by Hockey Bengal. The team plays its home matches mostly at the Mohun Bagan Ground and also at the SAI Sports Complex at Salt Lake Stadium.

The club participates in the Calcutta Hockey League and the Beighton Cup. The team have won 41 major state titles which includes 25 CHL and 14 Beighton Cup titles.

History
Mohun Bagan started their hockey section in the early thirties and got affiliated with the Bengal Hockey Association (BHA). The Club participated in the Calcutta Hockey League and the Beighton Cup and were the second Indian hockey team to win the Calcutta Hockey League after Greer Sporting in the 1935 season.

The club disbanded their hockey section in 2000, but was eventually revived after 22 years in 2022.

Honours

League
Calcutta Hockey League
Champions (26): 1935, 1951, 1952, 1955, 1956, 1957, 1958, 1962, 1969, 1970, 1971, 1972, 1974, 1975, 1977, 1978, 1980, 1981, 1986, 1987, 1988, 1995, 1997, 1998, 1999, 2023

Cup
Beighton Cup
Champions (14): 1952, 1958, 1960, 1964, 1965, 1968, 1969, 1971, 1973, 1974, 1975, 1977, 1978, 1979
Runners-up (3): 1956, 1972, 1980

Agha Khan Cup
Champions (1): 1964

Bombay Gold Cup
Champions (1): 1964
Runners-up (1): 1970

Notable players
Notable players who have represented Mohun Bagan includes Olympians Keshav Dutt, Ashok Kumar, Jaswant Singh Rajput, Joginder Singh, Inam-ur Rahman.

References

External links
Club website

Mohun Bagan AC
Field hockey in West Bengal
Sports clubs in Kolkata
Indian field hockey clubs